Thomas, Tom or Tommy Pearson may refer to:
 Thomas Pearson (book collector) (c. 1740–1781), British army officer, traveller, and book collector
 Thomas Pearson (cricketer) (1851–1935), English cricketer
 Thomas Pearson (British Columbia politician) (1859–1939), Canadian politician
 Tom Pearson (footballer) (1866–1918), English footballer
 Thomas Pearson (bishop) (1870–1938), English catholic bishop
 Tom Pearson (rugby union, born 1872)  (1872–1957), Welsh rugby union player
 Tom Pearson (rugby union, born 1926)  (1926–2010), Scottish rugby union player
 Tom Pearson (rugby union, born 1999) English rugby union player
 T. Gilbert Pearson (Thomas Gilbert Pearson, 1873–1943), American conservationist
 Tommy Pearson (1913–1999), Scottish footballer and manager
 Thomas Pearson (British Army officer, born 1782) (1782–1847)
 Thomas Pearson (British Army officer, born 1914) (1914–2019)
 T. R. Pearson (Thomas Reid Pearson, born 1956), American writer
 Thomas Hooke Pearson (1806–1892), British Army general

See also
 Thomas Person (1733–1800), American politician and military officer